The International Bilingual School at Hsinchu Science Park (IBSH), formerly known as '''Bilingual Department of National Experimental High School At Science Based Industrial Park'year after a visit from the Western Association of Schools and Colleges in the spring of 2008. In summer 2011, IBSH was granted WASC accreditation. It serves students in the English-speaking community who seek an American college-preparatory education or plan to transfer into the local school system.

Student body
The Bilingual Department had at least 700 students from Grades 1-12 enrolled for the 2008-2009 school year. Over half of these students were U.S. citizens. Students come from business, professional, government, and diplomatic families. 41% of IBSH parents have a PhD.

Each grade is split up into two classes, A and B, each with its own homeroom teacher. 39 of the 61 certified full-time teachers have master's degrees and two have PhDs. 38 of the teachers are East Asian, 18 are American, and 5 are Canadian. The faculty-to-student ratio is 1:20.

Academics
Students are put through a challenging curriculum that follows an American high school format, albeit with mandatory Chinese classes. Many go on to attend prestigious institutions such as the University of Southern California, University of Michigan, Rice University, University of Pennsylvania, Harvard University, The College of Charleston, Columbia University, Yale University, Princeton University, Duke University, Massachusetts Institute of Technology, Carnegie Mellon University, Northwestern University, University of Chicago, and the University of California system universities. Honor courses offered include Math (9-12), English (9-12), World History (10), and many Advanced Placement courses. AP courses offered at IBSH include Studio Art, Biology, Chemistry, Calculus AB/BC, Chinese Language and Culture, Computer Science, English Literature and Composition, Environmental Science, European History, Micro/Macroeconomics, Physics 1, Physics C, Psychology, Statistics, US History, US Government and Politics, and European History. In May 2008, 195 students took a total of 325 AP tests. 41.5% scored a 5, 18.8% a 4, 16.9% a 3, 8.9% a 2, and 13.8% a 1, with an average score of 3.625.

The class of 2009 had 51 students. Up to September 2008, these students scored an average of 639V, 699M, and 654W (combined average of 1992) on the SAT, well above the U.S. national average. Six members of the class of 2018 have been named Finalists in the National Merit Scholarship Program.

Extracurriculars
While students must keep up with the rigorous course load, there are also many active clubs, such as A Cappella, Student Government (BDSC), Circuit Breaking Crew (breakdancing), ShutterLensLight (photography), D.Co (Dance Company), Debate, Drama Club, Fellowship, Humane Society, GIN, Key Club, InterAct, Panthers Newspaper Club, CinemaScope (film club), and Yearbook. Many students are involved with Model United Nations, and the school hosts Taiwan's only THIMUN affiliated conference HSINMUN. Students also attend TAIMUN, PASMUN, TASMUN, HIMUN, NEMUN, STMUN, and THIMUN-Singapore conferences.

There are athletic teams grade 7-12 students may join. These teams play year-round and hold practices after school. Current teams include Badminton Team, Basketball team (Boys/Girls), Boys soccer team, the NEHS Cheerleading squad (co-ed), and most importantly, the NEHS Baseball Team. These teams have won games and tournaments at the city and county level.

IBSH holds a rivalry with the Junior High and Senior High Departments of NEHS, especially during Field Day, an all-school track and field competition held in early November.

Students host dances, concerts, and other events such as the back-to-school event (co-hosted by BDSC, InterAct, and Key Club), Beat Concert (co-hosted by InterAct and EDSC), the casual dance (hosted by BDSC), Charity Night (co-hosted by Key Club and InterAct), the semi-formal dance (hosted by BDSC), Prom (hosted by the junior class), TEDxYouth@IBSH, GLO Night: Club Central (hosted by the Global Leadership Organization), and Unplugged (hosted by Key Club).

See also
 National Experimental High School
 Hsinchu American School
 Taipei American School
 Dominican International School
 Morrison Academy
 Kaohsiung American School
 American School in Taichung
 Pacific American School
 Hsinchu Science Park

References

External links
 International Bilingual School At Hsinchu Science Park

1983 establishments in Taiwan
Educational institutions established in 1983
Experimental schools
High schools in Taiwan
Schools in Hsinchu

ja:国立科学工業園区実験高級中学
zh:國立科學工業園區實驗高級中學